Bolbelasmus is a genus of beetles in the family Bolboceratidae. There are at least 20 described species in Bolbelasmus.

Species
These 29 species belong to the genus Bolbelasmus.

References

Further reading

 
 
 
 

Bolboceratidae